The 1920 Hemel Hempstead by-election was held on 9 November 1920.  The by-election was held due to the death of the incumbent Coalition Conservative MP, Gustavus Talbot.  It was won by the Coalition Conservative candidate J. C. C. Davidson, who was elected unopposed.

References

Hemel Hempstead by-election
Hemel Hempstead by-election
Hemel Hempstead
Politics of Dacorum
By-elections to the Parliament of the United Kingdom in Hertfordshire constituencies
Unopposed by-elections to the Parliament of the United Kingdom (need citation)
20th century in Hertfordshire
Hemel Hempstead by-election